Windjammer is a 1937 American adventure film directed by Ewing Scott.

Plot

Cast 
George O'Brien as Bruce Lane
Constance Worth as Betty Selby
William Hall as Captain Morgan
Brandon Evans as Commodore Russell P. Selby
Gavin Gordon as J. Montague Forsythe
Stanley Blystone as Peterson
Lal Chand Mehra as Willy
Ben Hendricks Jr. as Dolan
Lee Shumway as Yacht Captain
Frank Hagney as Slum
Sam Flint as Marvin T. Bishop

Al Baffert, John Bagni, Jack Cheatham, Kernan Cripps, Lester Dorr, Jerry Frank, Al Herman, Warren Jackson, House Peters Jr., Marin Sais, Ted Stanhope and Florence Wix appears uncredited.

External links 

1937 films
1937 adventure films
1930s crime films
Sailing films
American black-and-white films
1937 romantic drama films
American romantic drama films
RKO Pictures films
American adventure films
American crime films
1930s English-language films
Films directed by Ewing Scott
1930s American films